Colasposoma flavipes is a species of leaf beetle of South Africa and the Democratic Republic of the Congo. It was first described by the German entomologist Edgar von Harold in 1877.

References

flavipes
Beetles of the Democratic Republic of the Congo
Taxa named by Edgar von Harold
Insects of South Africa
Beetles described in 1877